Madhira Subbanna Deekshitulu (18681928) is an Indian author known for his work Kaasi Majili Kathalu  a 12-part fantasy novel series in Telugu language. The 12-part series, known for its wit and humour, has been adapted in part into Telugu feature films.

Film Adaptations:
 Gollabhama (1947) (uncredited) (novel Kaasi Majili Kathalu)
 Keelu Gurram (1949) (uncredited) (novel Kaasi Majili Kathalu)
 Patala Bhairavi (1951) (uncredited)
 Navvite Navaratnalu (1951) (uncredited) (novel Kaasi Majili Kathalu)
 Sahasra Siracheda Apoorva Chinthamani (1960) (from Kasi Majili Kathalu) (uncredited)
Gulebakavali Katha (1962) (uncredited) (novel Kasimajili Kathalu)

References

1868 births
1928 deaths
Telugu writers